Save You may refer to:
 "Save You" (Kelly Clarkson song) (2009)
 "Save You" (Pearl Jam song) (2002)
 "Save You" (Simple Plan song) (2008)
 "Save You", a 2006 song by A. R. Rahman from Provoked
 "Save You", a song by Emilie Autumn from Enchant
 "Save You!", a song by Galneryus from Resurrection
 "Save You", a song by Matthew Perryman Jones from Music from One Tree Hill
 "Save You", a song by The Riverboat Gamblers from Something to Crow About
 "Save You", a song by Seasons After from Through Tomorrow
 "Save You", a song by The Sound of Arrows from the South Korean edition of Magic EP
 "Save You", a song by Veruca Salt from IV

See also 
 Save (disambiguation)
 Save Me (disambiguation)
 Save You/Save Me, a 2007 album by Nothing More